Ochna beirensis is a species of plant in the family Ochnaceae. It is endemic to Mozambique.

References

beirensis
Data deficient plants
Endemic flora of Mozambique
Taxonomy articles created by Polbot